Crew Gold Corporation was an international gold mining company that was focused on maximising the performance of its LEFA gold mine in Guinea. The company was listed on the Toronto Stock Exchange and secondary listed on the Oslo Stock Exchange with its corporate headquarters in Weybridge, United Kingdom. It has disposed of its interests in the Maco property in the Philippines, the assets of its Nalunaq gold mine in Greenland and the Nugget Pond processing facility in Newfoundland, Canada.

Further details Crew Gold Corporation past public filings are located at www.SEDAR.com.

References 

Gold mining companies of the United Kingdom